Oscar Alberto Vanemerak Bernal (born August 19, 1989 in Buenos Aires, Argentina) is an Argentine footballer, who currently plays for Bogotá F.C. in the Categoría Primera B.

Career
The Argentina-born footballer began his career for the Colombian club Millonarios. After earning 20 professional caps with Millonarios, he left to sign with the Chilean club Provincial Osorno in the Liga Chilena de Fútbol: Primera División. He played the 2008 season for Provincial Osorno and scored five goals in only nine games, then returned to Colombia to sign with Boyacá Chicó F.C. After six games for Boyacá Chicó F.C., he signed in January 2010 with Bogotá F.C. of the Categoría Primera B, where he plays today.

References

1989 births
Living people
Footballers from Buenos Aires
Argentine footballers
Provincial Osorno footballers
Argentine expatriate sportspeople in Colombia
Millonarios F.C. players
Expatriate footballers in Chile
Argentine expatriate sportspeople in Chile
Boyacá Chicó F.C. footballers
Association football forwards
Expatriate footballers in Colombia